"Been Gone" is the second single from Canadian R&B/hip hop singer Keshia Chanté's second studio album 2U. The single was produced by Philadelphia production company The Matrax. The music video premiered on MuchMusic at 5:00pm (EST) on September 14, 2006. The song features a sped up section of Antonio Vivaldi's "Winter" which plays throughout most of the song. It peaked at 10 on the Canadian BDS Radio Airplay chart.

2006 singles
2006 songs
Keshia Chanté songs
Epic Records singles
Songs written by Boi-1da